Mario Alberto Barcia (born 5 November 1989) is an Argentine footballer who currently plays for National Premier Leagues Victoria club Oakleigh Cannons as a midfielder.

Career

On 25 January 2019, Barcia signed for Liga 1 club Semen Padang. On 21 June 2019, Barcia made his professional debut as a substitute in a 2–1 loss against Badak Lampung.

On 10 October 2019, Barcia returned to Team Wellington.

In 2021, Barcia signed to plays for National Premier Leagues Victoria club Avondale FC.

References

External links 
 
 Mario Barcia Interview
 Mario Barcia, an Argentine champion from Oceania 
 Mario Barcia's circuitous route to fulfill 'dream' of playing in the Fifa Club World Cup

Club Aurora players
Central Córdoba de Santiago del Estero footballers
Hawke's Bay United FC players
Team Wellington players
Semen Padang F.C. players
Liga 1 (Indonesia) players
1989 births
Living people
Argentine footballers
Argentine expatriate footballers
Sportspeople from Santiago del Estero Province
Association football midfielders